The 2015–16 STOK Elite Division was the 1st season of the Cypriot fourth-level football league. Livadiakos/Salamina Livadion won their 1st title.

Format
Fourteen teams participated in the 2015–16 STOK Elite Division. All teams played against each other twice, once at their home and once away. The team with the most points at the end of the season crowned champions. The first three teams were promoted to the 2016–17 Cypriot Third Division and the last two teams were relegated to the regional leagues.

Point system
Teams received three points for a win, one point for a draw and zero points for a loss.

Changes from previous season
Teams of 2014–15 Cypriot Fourth Division
 AEN Ayiou Georgiou Vrysoullon-Acheritou 
 Livadiakos/Salamina Livadion 
 Adonis Idaliou
 ASPIS Pylas
 Elpida Astromeriti
 Lenas Limassol
 Frenaros FC 
 Spartakos Kitiou
 Enosis Kokkinotrimithia

Teams promoted from regional leagues
 Peyia 2014 
 Onisilos Sotira
 Kornos FC
 APEA Akrotiriou

Teams relegated from 2014–15 Cypriot Third Division
 Finikas Ayias Marinas Chrysochous

Stadia and locations

League standings

Results

1 Adonis Idaliou withdrew before the start of the league. All their matches were cancelled and all the opponents awarded a 3–0 win.
2 Elpida Astromeriti - Kornos FC 2013 awarded 0-3. Originally 1-0.

Sources

See also
 STOK Elite Division
 2015–16 Cypriot First Division
 2015–16 Cypriot Cup for lower divisions

References

STOK Elite Division seasons
Cyprus
2015–16 in Cypriot football